HMS Icarus was a  composite screw gunvessel of 8 guns, and the third Royal Navy vessel to carry the name. She was launched in 1885 at Devonport and sold in 1904.

Construction

Designed by Nathaniel Barnaby, the Royal Navy Director of Naval Construction, her hull was of composite construction; that is, iron keel, frames, stem and stern posts with wooden planking. She was fitted with a 2-cylinder horizontal compound expansion steam engine driving a single screw, produced by Barrow Iron Shipbuilding. Uniquely among her class she was built rigged with no main yards, making her a barquentine-rigged vessel; the rest of her class were barque-rigged. However, later pictures show her rigged as a barque. Her keel was laid at Devonport Royal Dockyard on 18 August 1883 and she was launched on 27 July 1885 by Miss Julia Wilson, the daughter of Admiral Superintendent Wilson; the launch was originally planned for 11 July but was postponed following the admiral's death on 4 July. Her entire class were re-classified in November 1884 as sloops before they entered service.

Career

Icarus was commissioned on 6 July 1886 at Devonport. On 8 October 1889, she ran aground in Plumper Sound whilst on a voyage from New Westminster to Esquimalt, British Columbia, Dominion of Canada. After returning from the Pacific in 1890 she had additional quick firing (QF) guns added.

In 1890 the levels of desertion and punishment under her commanding officer, Commander Annesley, was sufficiently high to prompt a question in the House of Commons. The reply by the First Lord of the Admiralty, Lord George Hamilton, reveals good reason for the concern, since Icarus only had a total complement of 126:

An inquiry concluded that Annesley had, as alleged in various newspapers, applied a "punishment not recognised in the Service", and was duly court martialled.  He was found guilty and awarded a public reprimand.

Her last years were spent on the Pacific Station, based in Esquimalt Royal Navy Dockyard at Esquimalt, in British Columbia, Canada. In early 1900 she visited San Francisco, under Commander George Francis Savage Knowling, and in late Summer 1901 she visited Panama. The following year she returned to the United Kingdom, stopping at Pernambuco and São Vicente, Cape Verde. She arrived at Devonport on 10 May 1902, and proceeded to Sheerness to pay off at Chatham on 4 June 1902, where she was placed in the C Division of the Dockyard reserve.

Fate
Icarus was sold on 12 April 1904.

Notes

References

External links
 

 

Mariner-class gunvessels
Ships built in Plymouth, Devon
1885 ships
Victorian-era gunboats of the United Kingdom
Maritime incidents in October 1889